Almada Atlético Clube is a Portuguese sports club based in Almada. They were founded in 1944 and currently play at Campo de Jogos do Pragal.

As of the 2011–12 season they play in I Divisao of the Associação de Futebol de Setúbal regional leagues.

Almada has won three Setúbal District titles and two Terceira Divisão titles. Their best classification overall was a runner-up finish in the Second Division South Zone in 1966.

Honours
Terceira Divisão: 1948–49, 1955–56
Setúbal District Championship: 1948–49, 1996–97, 2003–04

External links
Official website 

Football clubs in Portugal
Association football clubs established in 1944
1944 establishments in Portugal
Sport in Almada